Andrew James Little (born 7 May 1965) is a New Zealand politician and former trade union official, currently serving as Minister of Justice and Minister for Treaty of Waitangi Negotiations. He is also the Minister for the Government Communications Security Bureau and the New Zealand Security Intelligence Service. Little was previously Leader of the Opposition from 2014 to 2017.

Little was the national secretary of New Zealand's largest trade union, the Engineering, Printing and Manufacturing Union (EPMU), and he was President of the Labour Party from 2009 to 2011. Little served as the Leader of the New Zealand Labour Party from 18 November 2014 until 1 August 2017, when he resigned to make way for Jacinda Ardern.

With the formation of a Labour-led coalition government in October 2017, Little was appointed as Minister of Justice, Minister for Treaty of Waitangi Negotiations, and Minister in charge of the Government Communications Security Bureau and New Zealand Security Intelligence Service. In July 2020, Little was appointed as the Minister for Workplace Relations and Safety. Following the 2020 election, Little left the Justice and Workplace Relations and Safety roles and was instead appointed Minister of Health.

Early life
Born in New Plymouth on 7 May 1965, Little was educated at New Plymouth Boys' High School. His father was a devout National Party supporter and Little recalls delivering National pamphlets under his father's direction when he was younger. When he was 17, Little got his first job as a labourer digging the main cable trench for a new methanol plant in Waitara Valley as part of the "Think Big" project. During his time there he noticed that the contractor he was working for was deliberately using a less than adequate amount of concrete than the work required. He finished work there at the beginning of 1984 and left upon being accepted to enter university. He had also worked as a timber yard worker and in security.

In the 1980s Little studied law, philosophy and public policy at Victoria University of Wellington, where he became active in the campaign against New Zealand's student loan scheme. He was elected president of the Victoria University of Wellington Students' Association and later served as New Zealand Union of Students' Associations (NZUSA) president in 1988 and 1989.

Career with trade unions
After graduating Little took a job as a lawyer with the Engineers' Union (a forerunner of the EPMU), with his work including Accident Compensation Corporation (ACC) and employment law issues. In 1997 he was appointed the union's general counsel (chief lawyer). Two years later, he was appointed assistant national secretary, and was elected national secretary when Rex Jones stood down from the position in 2000.

In 2007 Little was ranked at number 40 on the New Zealand Listener Power List.

Little became an important extra-parliamentary figure within the Labour Party and was one of the main advisors from the trade unions. Little was a representative on Labour's national council as Affiliates Vice-President, responsible for liaison between the Labour Party and affiliated trade unions. On 2 March 2009 it was announced that Little was elected unopposed as President of the New Zealand Labour Party. He held that post until 2 April 2011.

Member of Parliament (2011–present)

Little stood for Parliament in the 2011 general election; despite a loss in the New Plymouth electorate to the National Party incumbent Jonathan Young, he was elected as a list MP owing to his ranking of 15 on the Labour Party list. This was the highest rank given to a Labour candidate who was not an incumbent MP.

He took on the ACC portfolio and gained profile during the National Party's restructuring of the organisation. Together with Trevor Mallard, he launched attacks against ACC Minister Judith Collins, who eventually responded with issuing a defamation claim in May 2012. The affair resulted in the resignations of the Accident Compensation Corporation (ACC) chairman John Judge, and the ACC chief executive Ralph Stewart. In December 2012, Collins settled her defamation case against Little and Mallard following a hearing at the Auckland High Court.

At the 2014 election he again stood and lost in the New Plymouth electorate. Young was returned with a much increased margin, but this was partially explained by boundary changes. Little was elected as list MP because of his ranking of 11 on the Labour Party list.

Little introduced a member's bill in the ballot that, if passed, would create a new criminal offence of corporate manslaughter. The Crimes (Corporate Manslaughter) Amendment Bill was drafted in the wake of the 2010 Pike River Mine disaster and the CTV Building collapse during the 2011 Christchurch earthquake. The bill is modelled on the United Kingdom's Corporate Manslaughter and Corporate Homicide Act 2007. At the time, Little stated the bill was needed because "the track record of prosecutions under the Health and Safety Act is that they tend to focus on lower level failures because getting the evidence and securing the conviction are easier, but personal responsibility for fatalities goes unchecked." A 2012 3News poll found that seventy-four percent of respondents would like to see a charge of corporate manslaughter introduced. The Bill was eventually transferred to the name of David Cunliffe but was not drawn before Cunliffe's retirement from Parliament in early 2017.

Leader of the Opposition (2014–2017)

Following Labour's defeat at the general election in September 2014, David Cunliffe resigned as leader of the Labour Party. Little announced his bid for the 2014 Labour Party leadership election on 9 October 2014 and was nominated by Poto Williams and Iain Lees-Galloway. He won the election, which was held on 18 November 2014, and defeated Grant Robertson, David Parker, and Nanaia Mahuta. In reporting on the election, some media focused on his trade union background. 

As Leader of the Labour Party and Leader of the Opposition, Little sought to challenge the Government with a strong alternative narrative. In a 2015 conference speech he introduced a new "Kiwi dream" theme (the New Zealand dream). In 2015 Labour introduced a new slogan, "Backing the Kiwi Dream". Little largely focused on issues and concerns such as rising house prices in urban areas, a 'brain drain', unemployment and job security and the growing wage gap between baby boomers and millennials—the "Kiwi dream" narrative was particularly designed to engage young voters.

Little appointed long-serving Labour MP Annette King as Labour's 'interim' deputy leader shortly after his election as leader. This appointment was made permanent in October 2015 after Jacinda Ardern (who had previously sought to be Robertson's deputy leader) was reportedly offered the role but turned it down. Robertson was appointed finance spokesperson and ranked third in the caucus in a bid to unify different groups within the party. For much of Little's leadership, key portfolios in the Little shadow Cabinet were held by King (health), Phil Twyford (housing), Chris Hipkins (education), Ardern (justice and children) and Carmel Sepuloni (social development). Little reshuffled his shadow cabinet in November 2015 (demoting David Cunliffe), December 2016 (after the retirements of Phil Goff and David Shearer) and March 2017 (in which Ardern was promoted to deputy leader).

Little was criticised by some for perceived poor performance in television interviews, his low profile and poor name recognition with the general public. A Dominion Post assessment said "he has little charisma and a lack of new ideas" and criticised Labour's "bare platform". He was praised by political commentators early in his leadership for uniting the party caucus and averting the infighting that characterised David Cunliffe's tenure as leader, though at the expense of dropping many of the party's former policy proposals.

In October 2016 Labour floated the idea of a levy on employers who imported offshore skilled labour rather than upskilled their domestic workers. Little responded to criticisms that it amounted to a "tax on immigrants", saying "If we want to make sure we've got the skills for the future ... for those employers who don't take on apprentices, don't invest in training, you can contribute a levy and that'll help to defray the cost of those who are doing the training". Little also criticised the number of travel visas granted to semi-skilled workers, citing statistics. Kirk Hope, Chief executive of Business New Zealand, criticised the proposal policy and warned that it would affect smaller businesses who are unable to recruit enough local workers.

Little was sued for defamation by Lani and Earl Hagaman after he made statements linking a contract awarded to their company with donations they had made to the National Party. In April 2017, a jury cleared him of some of the charges, and were unable to reach a verdict on others.

On 1 August 2017, Little resigned as Leader of the Labour Party due to the party's history of low results in polls, and was succeeded by deputy leader Jacinda Ardern. Little was later lauded by party supporters for "selflessly" putting aside his personal ambition to allow Ardern to lead the party, which saw a swift reversal of fortune for Labour and the opportunity to form a new government after the 2017 general election with New Zealand First and the Green Party. Little served as Labour's justice spokesperson over the election period.

Cabinet Minister (2017–present)

First term (2017–2020)
Little was elected as a Cabinet Minister by the Labour Party caucus following Labour's formation of a government with New Zealand First and the Greens. In late October 2017, Little assumed several portfolios including Minister of Justice, Minister for Courts, Minister Responsible for the Government Communications Security Bureau (GCSB) and the New Zealand Security Intelligence Service (NZSIS), Minister for Treaty of Waitangi Negotiations, and Minister Responsible for Pike River Re-entry.

On 20 November 2018, Little announced the creation of the Pike River Recovery Agency to plan a manned re-entry of the Pike River Mine in order to recover the bodies of the 29 miners who perished during the Pike River Mine disaster in September 2010. On 19 April 2018, Little entered the Pike River mine portal with victims' family representatives Anna Osborne and Sonya Rockhouse to demonstrate that a safe re-entry was possible. He also promised that the Government would re-enter the drift to recover evidence and the remains of deceased miners. Drift entry was achieved in 2019 but plans to recover the victims' bodies were abandoned in 2021.

As Justice Minister, Little announced plans in December 2017 to reduce the prison population by 30 per cent over the next 15 years. The prison population at the time was 10,394. Towards this goal, in May 2018, he announced the Government would repeal the contentious 'three strikes' law – the Sentencing and Parole Reform Act 2010 – which had been introduced by the previous National Government. NZ First refused to back this proposal forcing Little to announce on 11 June 2018 that the coalition Government had abandoned the plan.

Little later voiced criticism of Australia's deportation of New Zealanders in Australia during a controversial Australian Broadcasting Corporation documentary entitled "Don't Call Australia Home", that was released on 17 July 2018. Under changes to the Australian Migration Act, any foreigners with a criminal record or who do not meet a "character test" are subject to deportation. Little remarked that Australia's deportation policy would damage the sibling relationship between the two countries. Little's remarks drew criticism from the Australian Assistant Minister for Home Affairs Alex Hawke, who defended the deportations on law and order grounds and criticized Little for not urging New Zealand citizens to obey Australian law. In response, Little criticized Australia's deportation laws for lacking "humanitarian ideals" and described the removal of New Zealand citizens who identified as Australian residents as a human rights violation. In response, the Australian Minister for Home Affairs Peter Dutton defended his government's deportation policy and called on Little to reflect "a little more" on the Trans-Tasman relationship. Little countered by expressing concern about what he perceived as a growing "venality" in Australia's treatment of foreigners.

On 24 July 2018, Little rejected a call by the United Nations committee on women's rights for a Royal Commission of Inquiry into New Zealand's Family Court system, saying the New Zealand Government already has a fair idea of what the problems were. Little had already ordered a Ministerial Review of the Family Court.

After the Christchurch mosque shootings in March 2019, Little told Radio New Zealand, “I have given authority to the agencies to do intrusive activities under warrant, the number of those (warrants) I’m not at liberty to disclose". He said that the intelligence services usually put 30 to 40 people under monitoring at a time. Although more people than usual were being monitored, he was not willing to reveal how many. He also stated that the operations could be anything from physical surveillance to watching telecommunications activity.

On 5 August 2019, as Justice Minister, Little announced abortion law reform legislation that would permit abortion without restrictions for the first 20 weeks of a woman's pregnancy. While later-term abortions will still require testing by medical experts, Little announced that abortion would also be removed from the Crimes Act 1961. Other changes include allowing women to self-refer to an abortion service, ensuring that health practitioners advise women about counselling services, establishing safe areas around abortion facilities, and ensuring that conscientious objecting doctors inform women about their stance and alternative services. Labour had negotiated with New Zealand First cabinet minister Tracey Martin for several months to ensure support for the legislation. Though Martin ruled out a referendum, she was overruled by NZ First party leader Winston Peters, who demanded a binding referendum. Little rejected Peters' call for a referendum, stating that the Government would seek the support of MPs from all parties to pass the legislation. On 18 March 2020, he voted for the bill at its third reading, and it became law as the Abortion Legislation Act 2020.

On 22 July 2020, Little was appointed Minister for Workplace Relations and Safety following the resignation of Iain Lees-Galloway due to an affair with one of his staff members.

Second term (2020–present)
During the 2020 New Zealand general election held on 17 October 2020, Little was re-elected on the Labour Party list. In early November, Little was named as Minister of Health and also retained his ministerial portfolios for the Government Communications Security Bureau, the New Zealand Security Intelligence Service, Treaty of Waitangi Negotiations, and Pike River Re-entry. He was additionally appointed Lead Coordination Minister for the Government's Response to the Royal Commission's Report into the Terrorist Attack on the Christchurch Mosques after that report was published in December 2020.

On 20 July 2021, Little, in his capacity as  Minister in charge of the Government Communications Security Bureau, confirmed that the spy agency had established links between Chinese state-sponsored actors known as "Advanced Persistent Threat 40" (APT40) and malicious cyber activity in New Zealand. In addition, Little confirmed that New Zealand was joining other Western governments including the United States, United Kingdom, Australia and the European Union in condemning the Chinese Ministry of State Security and other Chinese state-sponsored actors for their involvement in the 2021 Microsoft Exchange Server data breach. In response, the Chinese Embassy in New Zealand rejected the New Zealand Government's claims, claiming that China was a staunch defender of cybersecurity and firmly opposed all forms of cyber attacks and crimes.

In mid-June 2022, Little in his capacity as Health Minister acknowledged that the country's health system was under strain due to a manpower shortage and the effects of COVID-19 and the seasonal flu on hospitals and health clinics. However, he denied that health services were facing a crisis. In response, the National Party's health spokesperson Shane Reti accused Little of denying that New Zealand's healthcare system was facing a crisis. Little's remarks were criticised by various unidentified health workers, who reported that significant staff shortages and hospital demand in response to COVID-19 and the seasonal flu were straining hospital resources. In early July 2022, the Association of General Surgeons issued an open letter to Little stating that the staffing shortage was undermining the ability of doctors to deliver care to patients.

In late October 2022, Little in his capacity as Minister of Treaty of Waitangi negotiations apologised to the Taranaki–based Māori iwi (tribe) Ngāti Maru on behalf of the New Zealand Crown for land confiscations that occurred following the New Zealand Wars. Though the tribe had not taken part in the fighting, most of their land had been confiscated by the Crown.

During a cabinet shuffle that occurred on 31 January 2023, Little was succeeded as Health Minister by Ayesha Verrall. Little also replaced Peeni Henare as Minister of Defence. Prime Minister Chris Hipkins, who succeeded Jacinda Ardern earlier in the month, stated that Little had supported "any decision made about the portfolio" and added that he had full confidence in Little. Little also retained his ministerial portfolios for the GCSB, NZSIS, Public Service, Treaty of Waitangi negotiations and  Lead Coordination Minister for the Government's Response to the Royal Commission's Report into the Terrorist Attack on the Christchurch Mosques.

Personal life
Little currently lives in Island Bay, Wellington with his wife Leigh and their son.

He was diagnosed with early-stage prostate cancer in 2009; but after receiving treatment, he was given a clean bill of health. He has subsequently had annual check-ups.

See also
Shadow Cabinet of Andrew Little
Politics of New Zealand

References

External links

Profile on the Labour Party website

|-

|-

|-

|-

|-

|-

|-

|-

|-

|-

|-

1965 births
21st-century New Zealand politicians
Candidates in the 2017 New Zealand general election
Leaders of the Opposition (New Zealand)
Living people
Members of the New Zealand House of Representatives
New Zealand Labour Party leaders
New Zealand Labour Party MPs
New Zealand list MPs
New Zealand trade unionists
People educated at New Plymouth Boys' High School
People from New Plymouth
Victoria University of Wellington alumni
Victoria University of Wellington Students' Association presidents
Members of the Cabinet of New Zealand
20th-century New Zealand lawyers
Candidates in the 2020 New Zealand general election
Justice ministers of New Zealand